Leonard Montefiore may refer to

 Leonard A. Montefiore (1853–1879), Jewish philanthropist
 Leonard G. Montefiore (1889–1961), Jewish philanthropist